Peter-Jürgen Boock (born 3 September 1951) is a former terrorist of the Red Army Faction.

Earlier life
After completing secondary school, Boock began training as a mechanic but soon quit. Claiming that his father was a staunch Nazi, Boock then left his parents' home and travelled to the Netherlands. He became involved with illegal drugs, and was arrested for possession. Soon after this he attempted suicide. He spent the next few years in rehabilitation programmes and living in re-education homes, and came in contact with Gudrun Ensslin and Andreas Baader. He wanted to join the Red Army Faction but was deemed too young. He moved to Frankfurt am Main and continued abusing drugs. In 1973, he married Waltraud Liewald (who would also later become an RAF terrorist).

Terrorism
At some point between 1975 and 1976, Boock joined the RAF and went underground. He travelled to Southern Yemen, where he received terrorist training (including hostage taking and hijacking). He became an involved member of the second generation Red Army Faction.

In July 1977 he was the getaway driver in the plot to kidnap Jürgen Ponto. The plot fell through however, and Ponto was murdered.
In August 1977, Boock constructed a rocket launcher called the Stalin Organ, which was capable of firing primitive missiles. He trained the weapon on the offices of the Federal Prosecutor. The launcher didn't work, and Boock claimed that he had a change of heart at the last minute and deliberately sabotaged the weapon himself.
In September 1977, Boock was involved in the kidnap-murder of Hanns-Martin Schleyer, and was one of the RAF kidnappers who opened fire on Schleyer's car.
In 1978 he was arrested in Yugoslavia, with Brigitte Mohnhaupt, Sieglinde Hofmann and Rolf Clemens Wagner. They were later freed and flown to a country of their choice because West Germany turned down an offer from Yugoslavia to extradite them in exchange for eight Croatian political fugitives in West Germany.

Arrest and imprisonment
Boock distanced himself from the RAF in 1980. However in 1981 he was arrested in Hamburg. He played down his role within the RAF, though was sentenced to life imprisonment terms for his involvement in the Ponto and Schleyer murders. In 1992 he admitted his full involvement in certain RAF activities, such as the Schleyer murder.

He was freed from prison on 13 March 1998 and now works as a freelance writer near Freiburg.

In 2007, he accused Stefan Wisniewski of the murder of Siegfried Buback.

References

People from Nordfriesland
German prisoners sentenced to life imprisonment
Prisoners sentenced to life imprisonment by Germany
Members of the Red Army Faction
People convicted on terrorism charges
1951 births
Living people